Glendale is an unincorporated community in Island County, in the U.S. state of Washington.

History
Glendale was founded around 1907, and was descriptively named. A post office called Glendale was established in 1905, and remained in operation until 1943.

References

Unincorporated communities in Island County, Washington
Unincorporated communities in Washington (state)